Patterson is an unincorporated community in Harvey County, Kansas, United States.  It is located 5 miles south of Burrton at SW 84th St and S Patterson Rd.

History
Patterson was named for James Patterson, an early settler in Lake Township, Harvey County, Kansas. L.A. Hamlin "surveyed and laid out" the Patterson town site September 25, 1888, on land owned by Dr. Thomas S. Hunt (1830-1900) and Susan Barbee Hunt (1841-1920). In 1887, Dr. Hunt deeded land for right-of-way to the Kansas Midland Railroad Company. He developed the town and sold building lots. Patterson became a station on a railroad segment of St. Louis–San Francisco Railway that ran from Wichita to Burrton. Two passenger trains a day passed through Patterson.

A post office was opened in Patterson in 1888, and remained in operation until it was discontinued in 1927.

The community was located along a railroad line between Burrton and Bentley, but the track was removed in the 1990s or 2000s.

Geography
Patterson is located at coordinates 37.9433447, -97.6550458 in the state of Kansas.

Education
The community is served by Burrton USD 369 public school district.

References

Further reading

External links
 Harvey County Maps: Current, Historic, KDOT

Unincorporated communities in Harvey County, Kansas
Unincorporated communities in Kansas